The Association for Women Geoscientists (AWG) is an international professional organization which promotes the professional development of its members, provides geoscience outreach to girls, and encourages the participation of girls and women  in the geosciences. Membership is open to all who support AWG's goals. Members include professional women and men from industry, government, museums and academia, students from a cross-section of colleges and universities, retirees, and others interested in supporting the society's goals.

History 
AWG was founded in San Francisco in 1977. The original purpose of the society was to provide encouragement to women in the geosciences, a career choice where they were largely underrepresented at the time. Today, the purpose remains the same, although some advances have been made, as AWG membership approaches 1200 students and scientists, reflecting the increasing participation of women in the geosciences. AWG is a 501(c)(6) mutual benefit corporation with local chapters in many cities and at-Large members throughout the U.S. and around the world. AWG is a member society of the American Geological Institute, the umbrella organization of geological societies, and the Geological Society of America.

Notable members 
 Claudia Alexander
 Denise Cox
 Francisca Oboh Ikuenobe
 Sharon Mosher
 Sarah K. Noble
Sian Proctor

Activities 
The society provides and sponsors several programs that strive to achieve the goals of the society:
 The Association for Women Geoscientsts Distinguished Lecturer Program is a Speakers Bureau of female geoscientists available to give AWG-funded talks or lectures on their areas of interest
 Scholarships
 AWG Outstanding Educator Award
 GAEA bi-monthly newsletter
 Geology field trips

References

External links 

AWG San Francisco Bay Area Chapter
AWG Lone Star Chapter
AWG Puget Sound Chapter
AWG Minnesota Chapter

Geology societies

Organizations for women in science and technology
Organizations established in 1977

History of women in California